Niagara County Community College (NCCC) is a public community college in Sanborn, New York, in Niagara County. NCCC offers associate degrees and was founded on November 8, 1962 and is sponsored by Niagara County. It is part of the State University of New York. The new campus was built and opened in 1973. Dual admissions programs facilitate transfer to four-year colleges upon completion of the two-year degree programs.

History

Campus 
The campus is located on the corner of New York State Route 31 and New York State Route 429. The college's first home as the former Nabisco factory at 430 Buffalo Avenue (later as Days Inn Riverview at the Falls and Fallside Hotel and Conference Center).
The Ernest Notar Administration Building contains the colleges administrative offices. It is named for Dr. Ernest Notar, the first president of the college from 1962 to 1975.
The Business Education Building is the location of the Business Division.
The Science/Technology Building is the home of the Life Sciences, Nursing, and Mathematics/Computer Science/Physics and Engineering/Technology/Chemistry Divisions.
The Henrietta G. Lewis Library is the most architecturally striking building and has a collection of 95,391 books. Recently renovated to include pilot programs for upcoming Learning Commons. 
The Humanities/Social Sciences Building houses the English, literature, linguistics, languages, philosophy, history, government, psychology, sociology, anthropology, and economics departments.
The Fine Arts Building contains the Arts and Media Division and the college's 700-seat theater.
The Student Center holds the college bookstore, snack bar, Tim Horton's, student lounges, a game room, a bowling alley.
The Health Education Center includes a gym, which seats 2,000 and a fitness center.

Note (Not a complete list of specialties):

A – Building – Administration – Named The Ernest Notar Administration Building for the founding President, But Still Called A Building

B – Building – Business Classes / Computer Classes / Secretarial Science / Accounting Classes

C – Building – Science / Physics / Astronomy / Chemistry / Math / Computer Networking / Robotics Classes

D – Building – Library / Art Gallery / Day Care / Digital Media Classes / TV Studio / Open-Access Computer Lab / Learning Commons

E – Building – English / Social Science / Psychology / Astronomy Planetarium / Foreign Language Classes

F – Building – Fine Arts / Speech, Public Speaking Classes / Auditorium / Ceramics Studio / Drawing Studio's

G – Building – Student Center, Food Services / Security

H – Building – Gym / Racket & Squash Courts / Weight Training / Health Classes

On August 29, 2008, the college opened its first student housing complex consisting of 85 suite style units for 348 students.

Athletics
The college has had a rich history in athletics and has been known for their accomplishments in wrestling and baseball. At first they were known as the Niagara Frontiersmen and then the Trailblazers in 1984 and became the Thunderwolves in 2010. Bob McKeown, a former athlete and head coach, was named athletic director in fall 2010. The college's first mascot, Tripp, was introduced in November 2010. Also they have a rich history in wrestling because of Coach Eric Knuutila. He has created numerous All-Americans and several national champions, such as Rashad Evans.

Buildings of Niagara County Community College

Distinguished alumni
 Rashad Evans, NJCAA Wrestling Champion; professional Mixed Martial Artist, won The Ultimate Fighter 2, former UFC Light-Heavyweight Champion
 George Maziarz, a New York State Senator (for 62nd District), former North Tonawanda City Clerk and Niagara County Clerk
 Pete Wagner

Administration

List of College Presidents:

 Ernest Notar 1963–1975 (as President) (lived from 1908 – February 6, 2003) 
 John Hunter 1974–1975; acting President
 Jack C. Watson 1975–1979
 Edward O'Keefe 1978–1979; acting President
 Donald J. Donato 1979–1989
 Gerald L. Miller 1989–1999
 Antonette Cleveland 1999–2002
 James P. Klyczek 2002–2017
 Dr. William J. Murabito 2017-

References

External links
Official website

SUNY community colleges
Educational institutions established in 1962
Education in Niagara County, New York
NJCAA athletics